Marius Voigt (born 20 February 1962) is a Norwegian former ice hockey player. He was born in Oslo, Norway as the son of Per Voigt, and played for the club IF Frisk Asker. He played for the Norwegian national ice hockey team at the 1988 Winter Olympics.

References

External links

1962 births
Living people
Ice hockey players at the 1988 Winter Olympics
Norwegian ice hockey players
Olympic ice hockey players of Norway
Ice hockey people from Oslo